The Cordillera de Rentema in Peru is formed by the summits of the Yactan, Naranjos, El Arenal, Picuy, Cumbe and Los Patos hills.

References 

Mountain ranges of Peru